Rhododendron catawbiense, with common names Catawba rosebay, Catawba rhododendron, mountain rosebay, purple ivy, purple laurel, purple rhododendron, red laurel, rosebay, rosebay laurel, is a species of Rhododendron native to the eastern United States, growing mainly in the southern Appalachian Mountains from Virginia south to northern Alabama.

It is a dense, suckering shrub growing to 3 m tall, rarely 5 m. The leaves are evergreen, 6–12 cm long and 2–4 cm broad. The flowers are 3-4.5 cm diameter, violet-purple, often with small spots or streaks. The fruit is a dry capsule 15–20 mm long, containing numerous small seeds.

The species is named after the Catawba River.

Classification
Rhododendron catawbiense belongs to the Subgenus Hymenanthes, within which it is further assigned to Section Ponticum and Subsection Pontica. The latter — one of the 24 subsections of Ponticum — also contains about a dozen other species. The taxonomy has been confused by a tendency to group all large leaved Rhododendrons under the catch-all R. catawbiense.

Cultivation and uses
Rhododendron catawbiense is cultivated as an ornamental plant, popular both in North America and in parts of Europe. It is primarily grown for its spring flower display. Outside of its native range, many cultivars and hybrids have been created, such as  'Purple Elegans', 'Roseus Elegans', and 'Grandiflorum'.

See also
 Catawbiense hybrid
 Central and southern Appalachian montane oak forest
 Southern Appalachian spruce-fir forest

References

Milne, R. I., & Abbott, R. J. (2000). Origin and evolution of invasive naturalized material of Rhododendron ponticum L. in the British Isles. Molecular Ecology 9: 541-556 Abstract.

External links

USDA Plants Profile for Rhododendron catawbiense
American Rhododendron Society: Rhododendron catawbiense
Rhododendron catawbiense Cultivar List — garden selections.

catawbiense
Flora of the Appalachian Mountains
Flora of the Southeastern United States
Natural history of the Great Smoky Mountains
Endemic flora of the United States
Taxa named by André Michaux
Garden plants of North America
Plants described in 1803